The Siskiyou Daily News is a daily newspaper serving Yreka, California, United States. It is owned by Gannett. Former owner GateHouse Media acquired the paper from Hollinger in 1997.

References

External links 
 
 GateHouse Media

Gannett publications
Daily newspapers published in California
Mass media in Siskiyou County, California
Yreka, California